Darmstadt is one of the three Regierungsbezirke of Hesse, Germany, located in the south of the state. The other two Regierungsbezirke are Giessen and Kassel

Economy 
The Gross domestic product (GDP) of the region was 207.7 billion € in 2018, accounting for 6.2% of German economic output. GDP per capita adjusted for purchasing power was 47,800 € or 159% of the EU27 average in the same year. The GDP per employee was 127% of the EU average. This makes it one of the wealthiest regions in Germany and Europe.

References

External links
 

Government regions of Germany
NUTS 2 statistical regions of the European Union
Regions of Hesse